Blackburn is a town in Pawnee County, Oklahoma, United States. The population was 108 at the 2010 census, up 5.9 percent from the figure of 102 recorded in 2000.

History
Located on the south side of the Arkansas River at a natural ford, the community of Blackburn developed after the opening of the Cherokee Outlet on September 16, 1893. It was named for Kentucky Senator Joseph C. S. Blackburn. A post office was established December 15, 1893. Because it was located in Oklahoma Territory, Blackburn was a "whiskey town" that bordered Indian Territory until statehood in 1907. The town was incorporated April 21, 1909.

While historically Blackburn's economy was based on agriculture, in the twenty-first century, the town serves primarily as a bedroom community for commuters to Pawnee and other job centers.

Geography
Blackburn is located at  (36.371655, −96.596497).

Demographics

As of the census of 2000, there were 102 people, 41 households, and 25 families residing in the town. The racial makeup of the town was 88.24% White, 8.82% Native American, and 2.94% from two or more races.

There were 41 households, out of which 29.3% had children under the age of 18 living with them, 58.5% were married couples living together, and 39.0% were non-families. 39.0% of all households were made up of individuals, and 24.4% had someone living alone who was 65 years of age or older. The average household size was 2.49 and the average family size was 3.44.

In the town, the population was spread out, with 28.4% under the age of 18, 6.9% from 18 to 24, 26.5% from 25 to 44, 20.6% from 45 to 64, and 17.6% who were 65 years of age or older. The median age was 33 years. For every 100 females, there were 85.5 males. For every 100 females age 18 and over, there were 97.3 males.

The median income for a household in the town was $12,000, and the median income for a family was $30,625. Males had a median income of $28,750 versus $5,000 for females. The per capita income for the town was $8,668. There were 28.6% of families and 34.7% of the population living below the poverty line, including 40.9% of under eighteens and 38.5% of those over 64.

Historic Site

Blackburn has the Blackburn Methodist Church at D Street and 4th Avenue, classified as being a Territorial-era Carpenter Gothic church of North Central Oklahoma, built in 1904.

References

External links
 

Towns in Pawnee County, Oklahoma
Towns in Oklahoma
Ghost towns in Oklahoma
Oklahoma populated places on the Arkansas River